The .375 Ruger (9.5×65.5mm) is a rimless, standard-length rifle cartridge designed for the hunting of large, dangerous game. It is designed to provide an increase in performance over the .375 H&H cartridge, yet to be chambered in a standard-length action rifle. The cartridge was designed in partnership, by Hornady and Ruger. In 2007, it was released commercially and chambered in the Ruger Hawkeye African and the Ruger Hawkeye Alaskan rifles.

Design & Specifications
Like the .376 Steyr that originates from the 9.3×64mm Brenneke and the .375 Dakota proprietary cartridge that originates from the .404 Jeffery, the .375 Ruger was designed to compete with the .375 H&H Magnum, yet have the advantage of having a rimless, beltless case and can function through a standard-length bolt-action rifle due to a shorter overall length. 

The .375 Ruger uses a unique cartridge case designed by Hornady and Ruger. This allows the cartridge to have a greater case capacity than a belted magnum case given cases of equal length. Unlike Remington Ultra Magnum cartridges, the Ruger Magnums can be chambered in standard-length bolt-action rifles. This allowed Ruger to chamber the cartridge in their existing standard length M77 rifle, without needing to use their M77 Safari Magnum Rifle.

While the .375 H&H Magnum is longer than the .375 Ruger, the latter cartridge has a 4% greater case capacity than the Holland & Holland cartridge, 99 gr. of water (6.42 cm3) compared to the H&H's 95. This is due to the .375 H&H Magnum having a long, tapered body, while the .375 Ruger follows modern cartridge designs in that it has very little taper and a sharper shoulder.

Cartridge standards for the .375 Ruger were issued by SAAMI in June 2007.

Performance 
Currently, Hornady and Double Tap manufacture ammunition for the .375 Ruger cartridge. The .375 Ruger's slightly greater case capacity, and the "short fat" cartridge efficiency lead to increases in the neighborhood of 150 fps over the H&H cartridge. Their capabilities remain essentially comparable. Since 2015, O.F. Mossberg & Sons produced bolt-action rifles of the "Patriot" series chambered in .375 Ruger with different stock options.

The .375 Ruger as parent case

300 Precision Rifle Cartridge
The .375 Ruger cartridge has functioned as the parent case for the 300 Precision Rifle Cartridge (300 PRC), which is essentially a necked-down version of the .375 Ruger. American ammunition manufacturer Hornady got the 300 PRC SAAMI-standardized in 2018. In 2019 it got C.I.P.-standardized as the 300 PRC. The 300 PRC cartridge case capacity is 6.2 ml (95.5 grains) H2O. The .375 Ruger cartridge case was used by Hornady as the basis for a new extra-long-range cartridge, since it had the capability to operate with high chamber pressures, which combined with a neck and barrel throat optimized for loading relatively long and heavy .308 diameter very-low-drag bullets without the need to seat the bullets deeply recessed into the case result in adequate muzzle velocities from magnum-sized bolt-action rifles. Rifles chambered for the 300 PRC must be capable of handling  overall length cartridges.

.300 Ruger Compact Magnum
The .300 Ruger Compact Magnum or .300 RCM was designed in 2007 and uses a case designed by Hornady and Ruger based on the .375 Ruger cartridge. This allows the cartridge to have a greater case capacity than a belted magnum case given cases of equal length. Unlike Winchester Short Magnum cartridges, the Ruger Compact Magnums share the same diameter from case head to body. This allowed Ruger to chamber the cartridge without extensively redesigning their Ruger M77 rifle to adapt them to the new Ruger cartridge.

.338 Ruger Compact Magnum
The .338 Ruger Compact Magnum or .338 RCM is a rimless, short-length rifle cartridge based on the .375 Ruger case. It was designed by Ruger and Hornady and released in 2008 and chambered in various Ruger rifles. The goal was to create a shorter cartridge than the big .338 magnums that would fit in a more compact rifle with nearly the same performance. Similar to the design ideas for the WSM cartridge family, but somewhat narrower which will frequently allow one more cartridge in the rifle magazine than the WSM equivalent. This round is designed for hunting medium- to large-sized North American game.

.416 Ruger
The .416 Ruger is a beltless, rimless, bottle-necked cartridge designed as a joint venture by Hornady and Ruger in 2008. The cartridge is based on the .375 Ruger case, which was necked up to accept a  bullet. It was designed as a dangerous game cartridge, particularly for use in Alaska and Africa.

.500 Bushwhacker
The .500 Bushwhacker is a semirimmed magnum handgun cartridge initially developed by fireforming the .375 Ruger case cylindrical, shortening it by 0.13 in, and threading the base for a rim. It was designed by brothers James Tow and Keith Tow of Halsey, Oregon, to provide comparable performance to traditional African stopping rifles from the context of the Magnum Research BFR revolvers.

See also 
 Table of handgun and rifle cartridges

References

 C.I.P. TDCC (Tables of Dimensions of Cartridges and Chambers) .375 Ruger

Pistol and rifle cartridges
Magnum rifle cartridges